MDAC may refer to:

 Mental Disability Advocacy Center
 Microsoft Data Access Components
 Mississippi Department of Agriculture and Commerce
 Multiple-dose activated charcoal
 Multiplying digital-to-analog converter
 Muscular Dystrophy Association of Canada